Zeller See or Zellersee, also Lake Zell in English, may refer to:

 Zeller See (Lake Constance), part of Lower Lake Constance, Baden-Württemberg, Germany

 Lake Zell, a lake in the Pinzgau near Zell am See, Zell am See District, state of Salzburg, Austria
 Zeller See or Irrsee, a lake in the Salzkammergut near Zell am Moos, Vöcklabruck District, Upper Austria, Austria

See also
 Zeller See Nature Reserve (disambiguation)